This is a list of player transfers involving Major League Rugby teams that occurred from the end of the 2019 season and through the 2020 season. The league confirmed the additions of three teams for the 2020 season, New England Free Jacks, Old Glory DC, and Rugby ATL.

Rugby ATL

Players in

  Harley Davidson from  Glendale Raptors
  Matt Heaton from   Darlington Mowden Park RFC
  Conor Keys from  Rotherham Titans
  Jeremy Misailegalu from  Utah Warriors
  Jason Damm from  Glendale Raptors
  Ross Deacon from  Rugby United New York
  Chance Wenglewski from  Rugby United New York
  Alex Maughan from  New Orleans Gold
  Eamonn Matthews from  St. Bonaventure University

Players out

Austin Gilgronis

Players in

  Daniel Faleafa from  Coventry
  Roland Suniula from  Seattle Seawolves
  Frank Halai from  Pau
  Potu Leavasa from  Warringah
  Enele Malele from Fijian Drua
  Corey Jones from  Old Glory DC/USA Sevens
  Sebastian de Chaves from  London Irish

Players out

  Kyle Breytenbach to  Houston SaberCats
  Josh Larsen to  New England Free Jacks
  Travis Larsen to  Old Glory DC
  Peter Malcolm to  San Diego Legion
  Ben Mitchell to  San Diego Legion
  Andrew Suniula retired
  Soheyl Jaoudat to  CS Beaune
  Simon Courcoul to  New England Free Jacks
  Timothée Guillimin to  New England Free Jacks
  Doug Fraser to  Old Glory DC
  Andrés Vilaseca to  Peñarol Rugby
  Dylan Pieterse to  Leopards/ Old Glory DC

Colorado Raptors

Players in
  Nick Boyer from  San Diego Legion
  Michael Curry from  Tasman
  Mason Emerson from  Hawke's Bay Magpies
  Jacob Finau from  Life University West
  Digby Ioane from  Panasonic Wild Knights
  Ryan James promoted from Academy
  Tomas Quinlan from  RC Narbonne
  Rene Ranger from  La Rochelle
  Aladdin Schirmer from  Seattle Seawolves
  Samuel Slade from  Counties Manukau
  Michael Stewart from  Rugby Southland
  Xendy Tatibouet from  Etang Sale RC
  Sakaria Taulafo from  Céret sportif
  Sean Yacoubian from  St. Mary's University

Players out

  Peter Dahl retired
  Harley Davidson to  Rugby ATL
  Maximo De Achaval retired
  Zach Fenoglio retired
  Casey Rock retired
  Dylan Taikato-Simpson to  Old Glory DC
  Shaun Davies to  Utah Warriors (as coach)
  Will Magie to  London Scottish
  Malon Al-Jiboori released
  Noah Barker released
  Murphy Taramai to  Hurricanes
  Jason Damm to  Rugby ATL

Old Glory DC

Players in
  Ryan Burroughs from  Northern Virginia Eagles
  Mika Dabulas from  Penn State
  Jamason Faʻanana-Schultz from  Houston Sabercats
  Doug Fraser from  Austin Herd
  Gordon Fullerton from  Waikato
  Travis Larsen from  Austin Elite
  Jack McLean from  Penn State
  Api Naikatini from  Seattle Seawolves
  Tevita Naqali from  Fijian Latui
  Jason Robertson from  Bay of Plenty
  Dylan Taikato-Simpson from  Glendale Raptors
  Jake Turnbull from  Houston Sabercats
  Danny Tusitala from  Auckland

Tendai Mtawarira from Sharks
Players out
  Cullen Barelka to  404 Rugby
  Corey Jones to  Austin Herd

Houston SaberCats

Players in
  Jake Christmann from Utah Warriors
  Kyle Breytenbach from  Austin Herd
  Tim Cadwallader from  Manawatu
  Matías Freyre from  Club Newman
  Zack Godfrey from  Leicester Tigers
  Taylor Howden from  New Orleans Gold
  Tiaan Loots from  Dragons
  De Wet Roos from  NSW Country Eagles
  Boyd Wiggins from  Northland
  Zachary Short from  Greerton Marist
  Nicolás Solveyra from  Jaguares XV
  Diego Fortuny from  Jaguares
 

Players out
  Mateo Sanguinetti to  Peñarol Rugby
  Santiago Arata to  Peñarol Rugby
  Alejandro Nieto to  Peñarol Rugby (player-coach)
  Josua Vici to  US Colomiers
  Jamason Faʻanana-Schultz to  Old Glory DC
  Jake Turnbull to  Old Glory DC
  Paul Mullen
  Pat O'Toole
  Deion Mikesell
  Matt Trouville retired
  Connor Murphy retired
  Jason Harris-Wright retired
  Chris Saint released
  Jack Riley released

New England Free Jacks

Players in

  Sam Beard from  Crusaders
  Isaac Cavu from  GPS
  Simon Courcoul from  Austin Herd
  Naulia Dawai from  Asia Pacific Dragons
  Tolu Fahamokioa from  Hawke's Bay
  Timothée Guillimin from  Austin Herd
  Kensuke Hatakeyama from  Suntory Sungoliath
  Brad Hemopo from  Manly
  Josh Larsen from  Austin Herd
  John Poland from  UCC
  Liam Steel from  Bay of Plenty
  Beaudein Waaka from  Manly
  Poasa Waqanibau from  Fijian Drua
  Mitch Wilson from  Life University

Players out
  Dolph Botha to  Griffons

New Orleans Gold

Players in

  Robbie Coleman from  Gordon
  Cullen Collopy from  Sharks
  Carl Meyer from  Ebbw Vale
  Jonathan Poole from  Life University
  Dino Waldren from  San Diego Legion

 
Players out

  Michael Baska to  Utah Warriors
  Taylor Howden to  Houston SaberCats
  Caleb Meyer to  Utah Warriors
  Ross Davies to  Pontypridd RFC
  Hubert Buydens retired
  Zach Stryffeler released
  Vince Jobo released
  Mason Briant released
  Kavika Peniata released

Rugby United New York

  Julio Cesar Giraldo from  Old Blue
  Mathieu Bastareaud from  Toulon
  Cormac Daly from  Connacht Eagles
  Jason Higgins from  Cork Constitution
 Rob Irimescu from  NYAC
 JP Aguirre from  Austin Herd

Players out
 Seamus Kelly released
 Chris Sullivan retired
  Ross Deacon to  Rugby ATL

San Diego Legion

Players in
  Paul Mullen from  Houston SaberCats
  Luke Burton from  Biarritz
  Chris Eves from  Hurricanes
  Peter Malcolm from  Austin Herd
  Ben Mitchell from  Austin Herd
  Devereaux Ferris from  Life West
  Ma'a Nonu from  Blues

Players out

  Nick Boyer to  Colorado Raptors
  Kapeli Pifeleti to  Saracens
  Paddy Ryan to  Munakata Sanix Blues
  Dino Waldren to  New Orleans Gold
  Jordan Manihera released

Seattle Seawolves

Players in

  Harry Davies from  Bedford Blues
  Ryno Eksteen from  Cheetahs
  Tim Metcher from  Counties Manukau
  FP Pelser from  Griquas
  David Busby from   Ulster
  Ross Neal from  Wasps

Players out

 Api Naikatini to  Old Glory DC
 Cam Polson released
 Aladdin Schirmer to  Colorado Raptors
 Roland Suniula to  Austin Herd
 Peter Tiberio retired
 Ross Neal to  London Irish (short-term contract)

Toronto Arrows

Players in

  Tayler Adams from  Southland
  Richie Asiata from  Queensland Country
  Tomás de la Vega from  CUBA
  Manuel Diana from  Old Christians
  Will Kelly from  Dragons
  Ben LeSage from  UBC Thunderbirds
  Tyler Rowland from  UBC Thunderbirds

Players out

  Morgan Mitchell to  Kamaishi Seawaves

Utah Warriors

Players in

  Michael Baska from  New Orleans Gold
  Caleb Meyer from  New Orleans Gold
  Michael Payne from  Brigham Young University
  Dwayne Polataivao from  Doncaster Knights
  Maikeli Naromaitoga from  Austin Herd
  Hagen Schulte from  Heidelberger RK
  Richard Stanford from  NSW Country Eagles
  Jurie van Vuuren from  Eastern Province Elephants
  Ratu Veremalua Vugakoto from  Fijian Latui
  Ricky Tu'ihalangingie from Brigham Young University
  Kalolo Tuiloma from  Counties Manukau/Highlanders
  Calvin Whiting from  Brigham Young University
  Bailey Wilson from  Utah Valley University

Players out

  Blake Burdette retired
  Jeremy Misailegalu to  Rugby ATL
  Arthur Bergo to  Corinthians Rugby
  Josh Reeves to  Corinthians Rugby
  Tim O'Malley to  NEC Green Rockets
  Adam Thomson to  Otago
  Johnny Ika to  Hawkes Bay/ Selknam
  Alex Vorster released
  Don Pati released
  Alex Tucci released
  Jeremy Leber  released
  Metai Tuimoala released
  Logan Daniels released
  Vernon Ale released
  Ian Luciano released
  Thomas Kacor released
  Jake Christmann to  Houston SaberCats
  Les Soloai released
  Vilame Vuli released
  James Semple released
  Simon Quickfall released
  Iniki Fa'amausili released
  AJ Tu'ineau released
  Jake Anderson released

See also
List of 2018–19 Major League Rugby transfers
List of 2020–21 Major League Rugby transfers
List of 2019–20 Premiership Rugby transfers
List of 2019–20 RFU Championship transfers
List of 2019–20 Super Rugby transfers
List of 2019–20 Pro14 transfers
List of 2019–20 Top 14 transfers

References

Major League Rugby